Ransom My Heart is a romance novel by Meg Cabot. It was released in the United States on January 6, 2009, concurrently with the novel Forever Princess. The book is, according to The Princess Diaries series, written by Mia Thermopolis as her senior project, where she told her friends at first that it was a book about Genovian oil. It was accepted for publishing during Forever Princess, the tenth book in the Princess Diaries Series.

Plot
When Finnula Crais, a beautiful yet feisty huntress who wears braies and is one of the late miller's daughters in Leesbury, discovers one of her sisters, Mellana, has become pregnant by a troubadour and spent all the money for her dowry on ribbons and trinkets for her other sisters' weddings (Including Finn's), she agrees to Mellana's insane idea that they could hold a rich man for ransom to pay for her dowry. Hugo Fitzstephen is twenty-five, and is Lord of Stephensgate (From which Finn is poaching the land and giving it to the servants, who are starving to death by Hugo's cousin, Reginald Laroche and his daughter, Isabella), and has a mighty way with women and wears a beard, but after his mother, elder brother and father dies, returns from the Holy Land to hold his rightful place after ten years he has been a soldier, stays at an inn. The innkeeper, the brother of one of Finn's sisters' husbands, tells a short summary of "Fair Finn" after she walks into the inn to talk to the innkeeper, since Hugo seems to have a strong attraction for her, yet he's seen woman more beautiful than her and she is wearing braies. Finn, hearing of Hugo's wealth from the innkeeper, but not knowing he was from those lands, decides that he would be a good man to hold for ransom, and lays out her trap. Hugo's squire, Peter, has his life threatened when two men at the inn want money from Hugo, not knowing that who he was, either, but Finn saves them both by pinning both of the men to the walls and threatening to do worse. She later walks off, leaving Hugo and Peter at the inn. They both try to look for her to say their gratitude, but they just stop and continue their journey, not knowing that she is following them, planning the next step.

Lord Hugo then goes to the springs for a swim, when he sees Finn, naked, going in, too. He stares at her, not knowing that this was her plan, and when she goes to the woods to dry up, he decides he will wait until she reappears to tell her that it is not a good idea to go around undressed when taking a dip. Then all of a sudden, Finnula comes out, as stealthy as a cat, and puts a knife to his throat and ties him up. He learns that she knew he was there and was waiting for a good time to kidnap him. She says that she got Peter too, by tying him up on a tree branch, not checking if he had a weapon. Peter then comes out of nowhere, crashes into Finn on her rib, causing her to become unconscious. Hugo then yells at Peter for crashing into Finn. Hugo makes Peter fetch water to wake Finn up. Finn, fully awake now, holds her knife to Hugo's throat again, and tells Peter to run now, go to where he's headed and to tell Hugo's friends and family that unless they pay ransom, he will never be seen again, and if he tells anyone he has seen the culprit, Hugo will die. She later reveals that it was a lie, since she can't truly kill a person without guilt following her, and Hugo, realizing she isn't dangerous at all, begins to tease her.

Hugo decides to lie to Finn about his wealth and says his name is Hugh Fitzwilliam, and he is a wealthy knight just returning to Leesbury. After having issues with keeping his hands off Finn, whom he has become attracted to, she unbinds him and instead carries his most valuable prize, an emerald, around her neck. On their first night during their two-day trip to Leesbury, they rest inside a barn and Finn hunts for food, since she has become infuriated with Hugo's teasing of her. Later that night, after another round of arguing, Hugo kisses her, and, knowing that if she lets him go to far, she will lose her maidenhood and end up like Mellana, rips away from him and argues with him again. After insulting Mellana after finding out both that she is poaching his property and the reason she kidnapped him, she declares him released and gives back the emerald. He refuses, though, and gives her the emerald again, since he sees Finn as someone who needs protecting from crueler human beings who would've definitely taken advantage of her and her innocence. Finn eventually forgives him and has him be her prisoner again.

After some chain of events, Finn gets a kirtle and with a cloak, disguises herself as Hugo's wife and, on the second night of the journey, they pay for a room at an inn and Finn is surprised that all her friends that work there do not recognize her a bit, partially because she is wearing a dress. They both get cleaned up, as Hugo shaves and bathes and Finn bathes and looks at herself in the only "looking glass" (mirror) in the inn, and realizes she looks rather pretty in the kirtle. When she goes to her room, she does not believe that it is Hugo since he looks decades younger than what she thought, and is very attracted to him. She reveals that she was once married, though it only last one night, for he died on their wedding night, though she didn't love him. She then says she does not wish to marry again, saying it wasn't for her. This upsets Hugo and he goes to do the dishes right after she says this. In the end, they sleep with each other, and they both enjoy it. They sleep with each other again the next morning, and after traveling, they finally make it to the village, where they meet Robert, Finn's brother, the sheriff, and other people from the town, where Hugo states he wishes to marry Finn, and Hugo's and Finn's full secrets are revealed: Hugo is not Hugh Fitzwilliam, but Hugo Fitzstephen, Lord of Stephensgate, and the person Finn had married but had died on their wedding night was Lord Geoffrey, Hugo's father.

The sheriff then explains to Lord Hugo how Lord Geoffrey and Finn met, what had exactly happened between them, what to deal with Hugo wishing to marry Finn, while one of Finn's sisters, Camilla, had been eavesdropping on the conversation and was explaining it to the sisters, while Finn was angry at Hugo for lying to her. After finding out all this, Hugo still wishes to marry Finn. When he and Robert argue and he eventually tricks him into giving his blessing, and Sheriff called a toast to celebrate the wedding. When Hugo came upstairs, he told Mellana that he'll give her a proper dowry and reveals, since the other sisters did not know, that he knows she is pregnant with the troubadour's child. Finn told him about how Geoffrey was crazy, since he thought she was his dead wife, Marie, and always called her Marie. She was very happy when he died, but that did not mean she was the one who killed him. Since the marriage was not valid, and Hugo was most likely going to die in war, the estate went to Reginald Laroche to take care of, at least until Lord Hugo arrives and claims the land. The strange part of Geoffrey's death was that Reginald had been at first keen on accusing Finnula of murdering the old lord, but when the marriage was declared void, he stop with the accusations.

Hugo arrives at the Fitzstephen Manor and the first thing he does is to order Reginald Laroche and his daughter, Isabella Laroche, out of the manor by the next day. Isabella, in desperation, tries to seduce Hugo but Hugo says tomorrow he is to be wed with Finnula. Isabella, in outrage, storms out of Hugo's room. That morning Robert saw Finn trying to make run for it, for Hugo had warned that Finn might flinch and ditch it. Finn asks him for some advice on how to be more ladylike. He said no more braies, stand still, and look pretty, and not to say anything witty. Then, at the wedding, Lord Hugo stood at the aisle, waiting, and then came Finn, looking like a lovely young maiden. Everyone in Shropshire came, to see the new Lady, and after came the wedding party.

The next day Hugo awakens to find that his new wife is already taking control of the estate. Finnula is outside in the meadow where all of Lord Geoffrey's belongings are being piled to be burned with the entire village in attendance as a show of how things will be changing with the new earl. Soon Hugo meets with the sheriff, John de Brissac, to discuss the Laroaches. In this meeting a part of the tower they had been standing under falls off and nearly kills Hugo. The men go to investigate and find evidence that it was purposefully made to fall on Hugo. Of course, the earl ignores this and instead goes with Finnula to the mill house to have lunch.

Here Finnula sees her newest brother-in-law, Jack Mallory, and is quite dissatisfied with how he has changed her old room. At one point she goes outside to get away from everyone and talks with Peter who has come to discuss a domestic issue with her. They part ways and eventually Hugo and Finnula prepare to leave. However, Skinner, Hugo's trusted horse, tries to buck him off when he sits down on him. It is discovered that a burr had made its way underneath the saddle. Peter now makes his reappearance with the news that someone is trying to kill Lord Hugo. Finn asks what Peter is talking about, as Hugo tried to hide the earlier assassination attempt from her. After they go, Peter talks with Robert's fiancé Rosamund and suggests that Finn is the one trying to kill Hugo and that she also killed Geoffrey. He laments that he will not be able to prove it, but Rosamund says she will take care of it.

At the manor Hugo is furious to find everything missing from his room, but Finn has had everything moved to Geoffrey's room. They go to the bonfire and Hugo forgives all the vassals their past-due taxes and Finn lights the fire. Hugo shocks and angers Finn by throwing her braies on the fire and she shouts at him before storming off. Hugo is suddenly shot in the shoulder with one of Finn's arrows and Finn returns, shocked, and cries out Hugo's name before he loses consciousness. Peter accuses Finn of trying to kill Hugo, which infuriates Robert, but Rosamund's father, the mayor, backs Peter up, which upsets Robert. Finn's sister Patricia accuses Mayor Hillyard of framing Finn so that Robert and Rosamund will not be married, but Hillyard reveals that Rosamund was the one who told him of her suspicions of Finn and Robert chooses to end their engagement. Sheriff de Brissac refuses to send Finn to jail, as she is still the lady of the manor, and instead takes her to his home and Finn's hunting dog, Gros Louis, follows.

Hugo is rushed back to the manor to be treated and Jamie stands guard at the door to protect his father, as he saw who pushed the stone and knows who is trying to kill him. Peter tries to enter Hugo's room, but Jamie stops him. Peter realizes that Hugo acknowledged that Jamie is his son and says they can't take any chances, chasing after Jamie as he runs away.

Hugo wakes up and the sheriff tells him what happened that he and Finn suspect Laroche, though Finn is in custody at his home. He tells Hugo that Peter accused her but has since disappeared, as have the Laroches, as they never arrived at Reginald's sister home where they were headed. The sheriff believes that they are all working together to try to kill Hugo. Hugo asks about Jamie and the sheriff realizes that no one has seen him in some time and Hugo orders him to find him.

Sheriff de Brissac's mother bosses Finn around to make her into a better wife but Finn cries in secret over her concern for Hugo. Finn's sisters visit her and reveal that Jack Mallory disappeared in the middle of the night, presumably never to return to Mellana. The sheriff tells Finn that they have not yet found Jamie, as the dogs keep losing the scent of his tunic, but he will not allow Finn to track Jamie with Gros Louis. Finn hatches a plan with the sheriff to announce that Hugo has died and Finn is to hang for it to draw the Laroches out, but the sheriff does not believe that Hugo will go along with it but leaves to inform Hugo of the plan while Finn sneakily steals Jamie's tunic. She sneaks out of the house with Gros Louis and goes to the forest where the other dogs lost Jamie's scent. She gives Gros Louis the tunic and begins to follow him.

The sheriff arrives back at the manor and Hugo refuses to go along with the plan. The sheriff realizes that Finn used her plan to steal the tunic and go after Jamie. Hugo insists on going after her, even though he is still gravely injured.

Finn realizes the trail is leading toward Wolf Cave where she sees the Laroches, Peter, and Jamie, who is still alive. She plans to turn back and get the sheriff, but Gros Louis goes after a rabbit and the Laroches hear him and recognize him as Finn's dog. Reginald Laroche threatens to kill Jamie if Finn does not reveal herself so she reluctantly steps out. Isabella says they should kill Jamie anyway, but Reginald soliloquizes, admitting his guilt in Geoffrey's death and in attempting to kill Hugo. Finn asks them to spare Jamie, as he is only a child, but Reginald insists that both of them will hang. Finn insists that the sheriff is close behind her, but Isabella taunts her. Finn punches her in the face, breaking her nose, as Gros Louis barks and Hugo suddenly rides into the clearing.

On his way into the forest, Hugo ran into Gros Louis and realized they must be at Wolf Cave before rushing there. As he arrives, Laroche grabs Finn and holds a knife to her neck. Hugo asks Laroche to duel, but he refuses, so Hugo puts up the manor as the reward for the winner. Peter insists that everything has gone to far, as he could never follow someone who would kill a woman and child in cold blood. Hugo and Laroche begin to duel and the sheriff and his men arrive in the clearing. Hugo is becoming weary from his injury as they duel, but he suddenly taps into his reserves of strength and overtakes Reginald, though Finn cries out and begs him not to kill him. Hugo releases Laroche into the sheriff's custody and Hugo asks Finn if she forgives him for burning her braies. She says she does and asks his forgiveness for kidnapping him, which he says she doesn't need to apologize for.

Six months later, Mellana has given birth to a boy and Finn believes that the sheriff will propose to her when his mother finally passes away. Laroche has been tried and hanged, while Isabella and Peter disappeared into Scotland after Finn had Hugo bribe the men holding them to let them escape. Hugo has become a well-liked earl, and Finn is visibly pregnant. While at the manor, Mistress Laver lets in some men that are friends of Hugo's from the crusades. One of the men hits on Finn and wraps his arm around her before she draws a secret knife and holds it to his throat. Hugo comes in with Jamie behind him and tells Finn that he has been to visit Robert, who says hello, and that he saw Rosamund there and the two of them will probably be engaged again soon. Hugo sees that Finn has a knife to one of the man's throats and tells the men that he sees they have met his wife.

Characters

Finnula Crais

Is the youngest daughter, she has five other sisters and one brother. Finnula is also called Finn and also goes under Fair Finn. She is a very good markswoman and prefers to wear men's clothing. She feels that Reginald Laroche is using the serfs injustice and uses her markswoman's skill to kill the game on the estate and gives the kill to the serfs so they don't die of starvation since, if her marriage to Lord Geoffrey had been valid, she would be their Ladyship. Though she had no say in the marriage, she vowed to protect her vassals. After Lord Geoffrey died, she was not in love with him but did not like the thought of marriage. Because of her older sister Mellana's situation she takes it upon herself in getting money for her sister's dowry to Jack Mallory, a troubadour who sings the worst of songs, which is how she met Hugo after noticing he could be worth much for ransom. During the trip to the village, she falls in love with Lord Hugo and beds him, making her officially not a virgin.  She is known to be courageous, loyal, to be handy with sharp objects, have amazing aim with a bow and quiver, and good hunting skills. She is described to have red hair, misty gray eyes, and fair skin.

Hugo Fitzstephen

Is the new Earl of Stephensgate. He has been absent in England for the past ten years fighting in the Holy Land for possession of Jerusalem. Back now in England he only wants to return home. He doesn't want to kill anyone and is plainly just tired of fighting. He finds Finnula to be a whole different type of woman and seems to never have met any woman of her kind before. He is described to have blond hair, hazel-green eyes, and when he had a beard, he looked old enough to be Finn's father and like a demented hermit.

2009 American novels
American young adult novels
Novels by Meg Cabot